In mathematical logic, a witness is a specific value t to be substituted for variable x of an existential statement of the form ∃x φ(x) such that φ(t) is true.

Examples 

For example, a theory T of arithmetic is said to be inconsistent if there exists a proof in T of the formula "0 = 1".  The formula I(T), which says that T is inconsistent, is thus an existential formula. A witness for the inconsistency of T is a particular proof of "0 = 1" in T.

Boolos, Burgess, and Jeffrey (2002:81) define the notion of a witness with the example, in which S is an n-place relation on natural numbers, R is an (n+1)-place recursive relation, and ↔ indicates logical equivalence (if and only if):
 S(x1, ..., xn) ↔ ∃y R(x1, . . ., xn, y)
"A y such that R holds of the xi may be called a 'witness' to the relation S holding of the xi (provided we understand that when the witness is a number rather than a person, a witness only testifies to what is true)."
In this particular example, the authors defined s to be (positively) recursively semidecidable, or simply semirecursive.

Henkin witnesses 

In predicate calculus, a Henkin witness for a sentence  in a theory T is a term c such that T proves φ(c) (Hinman 2005:196). The use of such witnesses is a key technique in the proof of Gödel's completeness theorem presented by Leon Henkin in 1949.

Relation to game semantics 

The notion of witness leads to the more general idea of game semantics. For more complex formulas involving universal quantifiers, the existence of a winning strategy for the verifier depends on the existence of appropriate Skolem functions. The Skolem function f (if it exists) actually codifies a winning strategy for the verifier of S by returning a witness for the existential sub-formula for every choice of x the falsifier might make.

See also
Certificate (complexity), an analogous concept in computational complexity theory

References 
George S. Boolos, John P. Burgess, and Richard C. Jeffrey, 2002, Computability and Logic: Fourth Edition, Cambridge University Press, .
 Leon Henkin, 1949, "The completeness of the first-order functional calculus", Journal of Symbolic Logic v. 14 n. 3, pp. 159–166.
 Peter G. Hinman, 2005, Fundamentals of mathematical logic, A.K. Peters, .
 J. Hintikka and G. Sandu, 2009, "Game-Theoretical Semantics" in Keith Allan (ed.) Concise Encyclopedia of Semantics, Elsevier, pp. 341–343

Logic
Quantifier (logic)
Mathematical logic